The 2020 CONMEBOL Pre-Olympic Tournament was the 13th edition of the CONMEBOL Pre-Olympic Tournament, the quadrennial, international, age-restricted football tournament organised by the Confederación Sudamericana de Fútbol (CONMEBOL) to determine which men's under-23 national teams from the South American region qualify for the Olympic football tournament.

In August 2018, CONMEBOL announced the return of the South American Pre-Olympic Tournament in 2020 with Colombia as the host country, after a 16-year absence. The last edition of this competition had been held in Chile in 2004. From the 2008 through the 2016 Summer Olympics, the two teams from South America were determined by the South American Youth Football Championship, always held in the previous year. The tournament was held from 18 January through 9 February 2020.

The top two teams qualified for the 2020 Summer Olympics men's football tournament in Japan as the CONMEBOL representatives. Argentina successfully defended their title won 16 years ago, and qualified for the Olympics together with runners-up Brazil, the defending Olympic champions.

Teams
All ten CONMEBOL member national teams entered the tournament.

Venues

Colombia was announced as host of the tournament at the CONMEBOL Council meeting held on 14 August 2018 in Luque, Paraguay. On 28 August 2019, Pereira, Armenia, and Bucaramanga were announced as the host cities.

Squads

Players born on or after 1 January 1997 were eligible to compete in the tournament.

Draw
The draw of the tournament was held on 5 November 2019, 19:00 COT (UTC−5), at the Auditorium of the Colombian Football Federation in Bogotá, Colombia. The ten teams were drawn into two groups of five. The hosts Colombia and Brazil as the current Olympic champions and best CONMEBOL team in the FIFA World Rankings as of October 2019 were seeded into Group A and Group B, respectively, and assigned to position 1 in their group, while the remaining eight teams were placed into four "pairing pots" based on their FIFA World Rankings as of October 2019 (shown in brackets). The positions of these eight teams within their groups were also defined by draw.

The draw was led by Hugo Figueredo, CONMEBOL's Director of Competitions, with the collaboration of Daniela Montoya, a member of the Colombia women's national football team, and former Colombian footballer Iván Valenciano.

Match officials
On 4 December 2019, CONMEBOL announced that the CONMEBOL Referee Commission had appointed 12 referees and 20 assistant referees for the tournament. Referees Guillermo Guerrero from Ecuador and Alexis Herrera from Venezuela as well as the assistant referee Byron Romero from Ecuador, who were not included in the initial list of officials, were summoned to officiate in the two matches of the final stage's last matchday.

 Facundo Tello and Darío Herrera
Assistants: Julio Fernández and Cristian Navarro
 Ivo Méndez
Assistants: Juan Pablo Montaño and Ariel Guizada
 Rodolpho Toski
Assistants: Kleber Lúcio Gil and Fabrício Vilarinho 
 Piero Maza
Assistants: Alejandro Molina and Claudio Urrutia
 Nicolás Gallo
Assistants: Dionisio Ruiz and Sebastián Vela

 Franklin Congo and Guillermo Guerrero
Assistants: Juan Carlos Macías, Ricardo Baren and Byron Romero
 Eber Aquino
Assistants: Juan Zorrilla and Darío Gaona
 Kevin Ortega
Assistants: Jonny Bossio and Jesús Sánchez
 Esteban Ostojich and Andrés Matonte
Assistants: Carlos Barreiro and Horacio Ferreiro
 Ángel Arteaga and Alexis Herrera
Assistants: Lubin Torrealba and Tulio Moreno

First stage
The top two teams of each group advanced to the final stage.

Tiebreakers
The ranking of teams in the first stage was determined as follows (Regulations Article 8):
 Points obtained in all group matches (three points for a win, one for a draw, none for a defeat);
 Goal difference in all group matches;
 Number of goals scored in all group matches;
 Points obtained in the matches played between the teams in question;
 Goal difference in the matches played between the teams in question;
 Number of goals scored in the matches played between the teams in question;
 Fair play points in all group matches (only one deduction could be applied to a player in a single match): 
 Drawing of lots.

All times are local, COT (UTC−5).

Group A

Group B

Final stage
The ranking of teams in the final stage was determined using the same criteria as the first stage, taking into account only matches in the final stage (Regulations Article 8).

Winners

Goalscorers

Qualified teams for Summer Olympics
The following two teams from CONMEBOL qualified for the 2020 Summer Olympic men's football tournament.

1 Bold indicates champions for that year. Italic indicates hosts for that year.

References

External links
CONMEBOL Preolímpico Colombia 2020, CONMEBOL.com

2020
Football at the 2020 Summer Olympics – Men's qualification
International association football competitions hosted by Colombia
2020 in South American football
January 2020 sports events in South America
February 2020 sports events in South America
2020 in Colombian football